Seven ships of the Royal Navy have borne the name HMS Stork:

  was a 36-gun ship, originally Dutch, captured in 1652, took part in the Battle of the Gabbard, hulked in 1653, sold in 1663.
  was a 10-gun sloop, launched in 1756, captured by the French in August 1758. Her first French captain called EV marquis de Calvimont de Tayac.
  was a 2-gun  wooden screw gunboat launched in 1855, used as a coal hulk from 1874, sold for breaking up in 1884.
  was a 4-gun composite screw gunboat, launched in 1882, used as a survey ship from 1887, lent to the Navy League in 1913 and moored at Hammersmith as a training ship for boys, broken up in 1950.

References

Royal Navy ship names